Greigia mulfordii is a plant species in the genus Greigia. This species is native to Ecuador and Colombia.

Two varieties are recognized:

Greigia mulfordii var. macrantha L.B.Sm. - Ecuador and Colombia
Greigia mulfordii var. mulfordii - Ecuador and Colombia

References

mulfordii
Flora of Ecuador
Flora of Colombia
Plants described in 1949